In Real Life (formerly known as In the Real World) is a Canadian reality show where eighteen young contestants aged 12–14 race across North America and compete in a series of real-life tasks, aimed to "discover the skills, strength, and stamina it takes to make it in real life." The show is developed and produced by Apartment 11 Productions.  The show is hosted by Canadian comedian and actress, Sabrina Jalees.

The first season of In Real Life was nominated for the Shaw Rocket Prize in 2010.  Sabrina Jalees was nominated as "Best Host in a Pre-School, Children's or Youth Program or Series" in the 2009 Gemini Awards.  The show was nominated for "Best Children's or Youth Non-Fiction Program or Series" in the 2011 Gemini Awards. In 2011, Mark Lawrence, the director of In Real Life was nominated for a Leo Award for "Best Direction in a Youth or Children's Program or Series".

The first season was originally planned to premiere on February 4, 2009, as In the Real World but was delayed one month. The first season premiered on March 4, 2009.  The second season premiered on October 4, 2010. The third season of the series premiered on October 3, 2011.

Overview
Each season of In Real Life features eighteen kids, aged 12–14, from across Canada competing throughout North America in various real life jobs.  At the start of each season, the eighteen challengers are paired up into nine teams of two and given team colours (red, orange, yellow, green, blue, teal, purple, grey, and brown (seasons 1, 2), or pink (season 3)).

In each experience, the challengers compete in three (or more) tasks related to one job in the real world.  Each experience also contains a hidden "Shield", which a team can find and use to protect themselves from elimination.  The first team/challenger to cross the finish line at the end of each experience is given the choice between two prizes: the "Big Reward" for instant gratification or the "Wrench" which will slow another team down in the next experience.  The second team/challenger to cross the finish line receives whichever prize the first team turned down.  The last team/challenger to cross the finish line is usually eliminated, unless they possess a "Shield" (and the second last team doesn't) or it is a non-elimination experience (season 1).
The shield cannot be used more than once in the competition but if you find it you can keep it for the whole competition.
When five teams remain in the competition, they will have the opportunity to split up and pair up with a new teammate. When three teams are left,  the teams are dissolved and the challengers will compete as solo competitors.

In the very last experience, the winner will receive the title of "In Real Life Champion", college tuition money, and an all-expense-paid family vacation.

Seasons

Awards and nominations

Records

 Talon holds the record for most times wrenched throughout the series, 5, whereas Kelly and Andreas hold the record for most times wrenched in a single experience, 2 times.

 Ruby-Rae, Maddison H, Sam, Amber, and Abhinav all tied for this record.

References

2000s Canadian reality television series
2010s Canadian reality television series
2009 Canadian television series debuts
2011 Canadian television series endings
YTV (Canadian TV channel) original programming
Television series by Corus Entertainment
Canadian children's reality television series
2000s Canadian children's television series
2010s Canadian children's television series
Television shows filmed in Montreal
Television series about children
Television series about teenagers